Kazaar is a 2009 Konkani film directed by Richard Castelino and produced by Frank Fernandes. It stars Larry Fernandes and Harshika Poonachcha. Larry stars in the movie as a NRI boy, who comes back to Mangalore to get married, while Harshika plays the role of his bride. The movie was initially scheduled to be released on 9 September 2009 but was delayed by two months, finally being released on 27 November 2009.

Synopsis 
The story is woven around family and social values, portraying the importance to society of marriage vows and family stability. The film focuses on traditional Catholic marriage rituals such as engagement and Roce. Larry Fernandes stars in the movie as a NRI boy from Dubai, who comes back to Mangalore to get married. After marriage, he faces resistance from his bride (Harshika Poonacha) for his move to return to Dubai.

Cast

Production
Daijiworld Media (Mangalore), the official International Media Partner for the movie, was instrumental in providing worldwide publicity coverage for the movie.

Casting
Larry Fernandes had difficulties in facing the camera for the first time, but got used to it within a few days after support from his team. Larry lost 15 kilograms (33 lb) in less than two months with a strict diet and regular exercises. Unlike Larry, his co-star, Coorgi actress Harshika Poonacha, had already acted in lead roles in two Kannada movies.

Filming

The movie was shot at various locations such as Mangalore (Mangalore International Airport (Bajpe), Someshwar Beach, and Pilikula Nisargadhama), Madikeri (Chomakudru and King's Cottage), Goan beaches (especially Dona-Paula), and Karwar. The film was completed in May 2009 and was initially scheduled to be released on 9 September 2009. Events such as cricket matches in 2009 and several other factors prevented an early release of the movie. The crew also wanted to release the movie in a good theater, due to the limited audience for regional movies. It got the Censor Board approval in November 2009. The movie had some glitches. The top portion of some scenes (including actors) was chopped off, reflecting the lack of professionalism in the work. Song pasteurization was adequate but patchy.

Sound 
The movie has five songs. Aloysius Paul D'Souza, Bishop of Mangalore, released the audio CD of the movie on 17 September 2009 at Don Bosco Hall (Mangalore), while the audio cassettes were released by Kundapur Narayana Kharvi, chairman of Konkani Sahitya Academy. The audio was brought out to the market by Julcas Audio International Corporation. The music was composed by Wilfy Rebimbus, Ragdev, and Vijaybharathi. Background music was composed by Bharati Das, with lyrics by Wilfy Rebimbus and Mick Max. The playback singers include Radhika Menon, Hemanth, and Rony Crasta.

Release and reception
The movie was simultaneously released at Adlab's Big Cinemas in Bharat Mall (Mangalore) and Udupi's Alankar theatre on 27 November 2009.

References

2009 films
2000s Konkani-language films